Coaches and media of the Southeastern Conference (SEC) bestow the following individual awards at the end of each college football season.

Player of the Year
 1933: Beattie Feathers, HB, Tennessee
 1934: Dixie Howell, TB, Alabama
 1935: Willie Geny, E, Vanderbilt
 1936: Walter Gilbert, C, Auburn
 1937: Carl Hinkle, C, Vanderbilt
 1938: George Cafego, HB, Tennessee
 1939: Ken Kavanaugh, E, LSU and Bob Foxx, WB, Tennessee
 1940: Buddy Elrod, E, Mississippi State
 1941: Jack Jenkins, FB, Vanderbilt
 1942: Frank Sinkwich, TB, Georgia
 1943: no selection made
 1944: Shorty McWilliams, HB, Mississippi State
 1945: Harry Gilmer, TB, Alabama
 1946: Charley Trippi, HB, Georgia
 1947: Charlie Conerly, TB, Ole Miss
 1948: John Rauch, QB, Georgia
 1949: Travis Tidwell, QB, Auburn
 1950: Babe Parilli, QB, Kentucky
 1951: Bill Wade, QB, Vanderbilt
 1952: Jackie Parker, QB, Mississippi State
 1953: Jackie Parker, QB, Mississippi State
 1954: Art Davis, HB, Mississippi State
 1955: Johnny Majors, TB, Tennessee
 1956: Johnny Majors, TB, Tennessee
 1957: Lou Michaels, T, Kentucky
 1958: Billy Cannon, HB, LSU
 1959: Billy Cannon, HB, LSU
 1960: Jake Gibbs, QB, Ole Miss
 1961: Pat Trammell, QB, Alabama
 1962: Jerry Stovall, HB, LSU
 1963: Jimmy Sidle, QB, Auburn
 1964: Tucker Frederickson, FB, Auburn
 1965: Steve Sloan, QB, Alabama
 1966: Steve Spurrier, QB, Florida
 1967: Bob Goodridge, E, Vanderbilt
 1968: Jake Scott, S, Georgia
 1969: Archie Manning, QB, Ole Miss
 1970: Pat Sullivan, QB, Auburn
 1971: Johnny Musso, TB, Alabama
 1972: Terry Davis, QB,  Alabama
 1973: Sonny Collins, TB, Kentucky
 1974: Rockey Felker, QB, Mississippi State
 1975: Jimmy DuBose, FB, Florida
 1976: Ray Goff, QB, Georgia
 1977: Charles Alexander, TB, LSU
 1978: Willie McClendon, TB, Georgia
 1979: Joe Cribbs, RB, Auburn
 1980: Herschel Walker, RB, Georgia
 1981: Herschel Walker, RB, Georgia
 1982: Herschel Walker, RB, Georgia
 1983: Reggie White, DT, Tennessee
 1984: Kerwin Bell, QB, Florida
 1985: Bo Jackson, RB, Auburn
 1986: Cornelius Bennett, LB, Alabama
 1987: Wendell Davis, WR, LSU
 1988: Tracy Rocker, DT, Auburn
 1989: Emmitt Smith, RB, Florida
 1990: Shane Matthews, QB, Florida
 1991: Shane Matthews, QB, Florida
 1992: Garrison Hearst, RB, Georgia
 1993: Heath Shuler, QB, Tennessee
 1994: Jay Barker, QB, Alabama
 1995: Danny Wuerffel, QB, Florida
 1996: Danny Wuerffel, QB, Florida
 1997: Peyton Manning, QB Tennessee
 1998: Tim Couch, QB, Kentucky
 1999: Shaun Alexander, RB, Alabama
 2000: Rudi Johnson, RB, Auburn
 2001: Rex Grossman, QB, Florida

Offensive Player of the Year
 2002: Artose Pinner, RB, Kentucky
 2003: Eli Manning, QB, Ole Miss
 2004: Jason Campbell, QB, Auburn
 2005: Jay Cutler, QB, Vanderbilt
 2006: Darren McFadden, RB, Arkansas
 2007: Darren McFadden, RB, Arkansas
 2008: Tim Tebow, QB, Florida
 2009: Tim Tebow, QB, Florida (coaches) and Mark Ingram II, RB, Alabama (AP)
 2010: Cam Newton, QB, Auburn
 2011: Trent Richardson, RB, Alabama
 2012: Johnny Manziel, QB, Texas A&M
 2013: Tre Mason, RB, Auburn
 2014: Amari Cooper, WR, Alabama
 2015: Derrick Henry, RB, Alabama
 2016: Jalen Hurts, QB, Alabama
 2017: Kerryon Johnson, RB, Auburn
 2018: Tua Tagovailoa, QB, Alabama
 2019: Joe Burrow, QB, LSU
 2020: DeVonta Smith, WR, Alabama
 2021: Bryce Young, QB, Alabama
 2022: Hendon Hooker, QB, Tennessee

Defensive Player of the Year
 2002: David Pollack, DE, Georgia
 2003: Chad Lavalais, DT, LSU
 2004: David Pollack DE, Georgia
 2005: DeMeco Ryans, LB, Alabama
 2006: Patrick Willis, LB, Ole Miss
 2007: Glenn Dorsey, DT, LSU
 2008: Eric Berry, DB, Tennessee
 2009: Rolando McClain, LB, Alabama
 2010: Nick Fairley, DT, Auburn
 2011: Morris Claiborne, CB, LSU (coaches) and Tyrann Mathieu, CB, LSU (AP)
 2012: Jadeveon Clowney, DE, South Carolina (coaches) and Jarvis Jones, LB, Georgia (AP)
 2013: C.J. Mosley, LB, Alabama (coaches) and Michael Sam, DE, Missouri (AP)
 2014: Shane Ray, DE, Missouri
 2015: Reggie Ragland, LB, Alabama
 2016: Jonathan Allen, DE, Alabama
 2017: Roquan Smith, LB, Georgia
 2018: Josh Allen, LB, Kentucky
 2019: Derrick Brown, DT, Auburn
 2020: Patrick Surtain II, CB, Alabama
 2021: Will Anderson Jr., LB, Alabama
 2022: Will Anderson Jr., LB, Alabama

Special Teams Player of the Year
 2004: Carnell Williams, RS, Auburn
 2005: Skyler Green, RS, LSU
 2006: John Vaughn, PK, Auburn
 2007: Felix Jones, RS, Arkansas
 2008: Brandon James, RS, Florida
 2009: Javier Arenas, RS, Alabama
 2010: Patrick Peterson, RS, LSU
 2011: Joe Adams, RS, Arkansas
 2012: Caleb Sturgis, PK, Florida and Ace Sanders, RS, South Carolina
 2013: Christion Jones, RS, Alabama
 2014: Marcus Murphy, RS, Missouri
 2015: Evan Berry, RS, Tennessee
 2016: Daniel Carlson, PK, Auburn
 2017: Daniel Carlson, PK, Auburn
 2018: Braden Mann, PK, Texas A&M
 2019: Jaylen Waddle, RS, Alabama
 2020: Jake Camarda, PK, Georgia
 2021: Jameson Williams, WR, Alabama and Velus Jones Jr., WR, Tennessee
 2022 Jack Podlesny, PK, Georgia

Jacobs Blocking Trophy

Given annually to the conference's best blocker

 1935: Riley Smith, Alabama
 1936: Bill May, LSU
 1937: Leroy Monsky, Alabama
 1938: Sam Bartholomew, Tennessee
 1939: Sam Bartholomew, Tennessee
 1940: Lloyd Cheatham, Auburn
 1941: Jack Jenkins, Vanderbilt
 1942: Jack Jenkins, Vanderbilt
 1943: John Steber, Georgia Tech
 1944: Billy Bevis, Tennessee
 1945: Billy Bevis, Tennessee
 1946: Hal Self, Alabama
 1947: Buddy Bowen, Ole Miss
 1948: Truitt Smith, Mississippi State
 1949: Butch Avinger, Alabama
 1950: Butch Avinger, Alabama
 1951: Jimmy Hahn, Tennessee
 1952: John Michels, Tennessee
 1953: Crawford Mims, Ole Miss
 1954: Charles Evans, Mississippi State
 1955: Paige Cothren, Ole Miss
 1956: Stockton Adkins, Tennessee
 1957: Stockton Adkins, Tennessee
 1958: Red Brodnax, LSU
 1959: Jim Cartwright, Tennessee
 1960: Jim Cartwright, Tennessee
 1961: Billy Neighbors, Alabama
 1962: Butch Wilson, Alabama
 1963: Tucker Frederickson, Auburn
 1964: Tucker Frederickson, Auburn
 1965: Hal Wantland, Tennessee
 1966: Cecil Dowdy, Alabama
 1967: Bob Johnson, Tennessee
 1968: Brad Johnson, Georgia
 1969: Chip Kell, Tennessee
 1970: Chip Kell, Tennessee
 1971: Royce Smith, Georgia
 1972: John Hannah, Alabama
 1973: Buddy Brown, Alabama
 1974: Sylvester Croom, Alabama
 1975: Randy Johnson, Georgia
 1976: Warren Bryant, Kentucky
 1977: Bob Cryder, Alabama
 1978: Robert Dugas, LSU
 1979: Dwight Stephenson, Alabama
 1980: Nat Hudson, Georgia
 1981: Wayne Harris, Mississippi State
 1982: Wayne Harris, Mississippi State
 1983: Guy McIntyre, Georgia
 1984: Lomas Brown, Florida
 1985: Peter Anderson, Georgia
 1986: Wes Neighbors, Alabama
 1987: Harry Galbreath, Tennessee
 1988: Howard Cross, Alabama
 1989: Eric Still, Tennessee
 1990: Antone Davis, Tennessee
 1991: Cal Dixon, Florida
 1992: Everett Lindsay, Ole Miss
 1993: Tobie Sheils, Alabama
 1994: Jason Odom, Florida
 1995: Jason Odom, Florida
 1996: Donnie Young, Florida
 1997: Alan Faneca, LSU
 1998: Matt Stinchcomb, Georgia
 1999: Chris Samuels, Alabama
 2000: Kenyatta Walker, Florida
 2001: Kendall Simmons, Auburn
 2002: Shawn Andrews, Arkansas
 2003: Shawn Andrews, Arkansas
 2004: Wesley Britt, Alabama
 2005: Marcus McNeill, Auburn
 2006: Arron Sears, Tennessee
 2007: Andre Smith, Alabama and Jonathan Luigs, Arkansas
 2008: Michael Oher, Ole Miss
 2009: Ciron Black, LSU
 2010: Lee Ziemba, Auburn
 2011: Barrett Jones, Alabama
 2012: Luke Joeckel, Texas A&M
 2013: Jake Matthews, Texas A&M
 2014: La'el Collins, LSU
 2015: Ryan Kelly, Alabama & Sebastian Tretola, Arkansas
 2016: Cam Robinson, Alabama

 2017: Braden Smith, Auburn
 2018: Jonah Williams, Alabama
 2019: Andrew Thomas, Georgia
 2020: Alex Leatherwood & Landon Dickerson, Alabama
 2021: Darian Kinnard, Kentucky
 2022: Ricky Stromberg, Arkansas

Freshman of the Year
 1986: Tommy Hodson, QB, LSU
 1987: Emmitt Smith, RB, Florida
 1988: no selection made
 1989: no selection made
 1990: Garrison Hearst, RB, Georgia (offense) and James Willis, LB, Auburn (defense)
 1991: Eric Zeier, QB, Georgia
 1992: Steve Taneyhill, QB, Carolina (offense) and Randall Godfrey, ILB, Georgia (defense)
 1993: Danny Wuerffel, QB, Florida
 1994: Peyton Manning, QB, Tennessee
 1995: Kevin Faulk, RB, LSU and Anthony McFarland, DL, LSU
 1996: Derick Logan, RB, Kentucky
 1997: Jamal Lewis, RB, Tennessee
 1998: Quincy Carter, QB, Georgia
 1999: Ronney Daniels, WR, Auburn
 2000: Jabar Gaffney, WR, Florida
 2001: David Greene, QB, Georgia
 2002: Kwane Doster, RB, Vanderbilt
 2003: Chris Leak, QB, Florida
 2004: Ko Simpson, DB, South Carolina
 2005: Darren McFadden, RB, Arkansas
 2006: Percy Harvin, WR, Florida
 2007: Knowshon Moreno, RB, Georgia
 2008: A. J. Green, WR, Georgia (coaches) & Julio Jones, WR, Alabama (AP)
 2009: Warren Norman, RB, Vanderbilt
 2010: Marcus Lattimore, RB, Carolina 
 2011: Jadeveon Clowney, DE, Carolina (coaches) & Isaiah Crowell, RB, Georgia (AP)
 2012: Johnny Manziel, QB, Texas A&M
 2013: Laquon Treadwell, WR, Ole Miss (coaches) & Alex Collins, RB, Arkansas (AP)
 2014: Nick Chubb, RB, Georgia
 2015: Christian Kirk, WR, Texas A&M
 2016: Jalen Hurts, QB, Alabama
 2017: Jake Fromm, QB, Georgia
 2018: Jaylen Waddle, WR, Alabama
 2019: Bo Nix, QB, Auburn
2020: Tank Bigsby, RB, Auburn and Connor Bazelak, QB, Missouri
2021: Brock Bowers, TE, Georgia
2022: Quinshon Judkins, RB, Ole Miss

Coach of the Year
League coaches have made selections since 1935.  The AP has made selections since 1946. The UPI also made selections from 1960 to 1990.

 1935: Jack Meagher, Auburn
 1936: Robert Neyland, Tennessee
 1937: Ray Morrison, Vanderbilt
 1938: Robert Neyland, Tennessee
 1939: Bill Alexander, Georgia Tech
 1940: Allyn McKeen, Mississippi State
 1941: Henry Russell Sanders, Vanderbilt
 1942: Wally Butts, Georgia
 1943: no selection made
 1944: John Barnhill, Tennessee
 1945: Frank Thomas, Alabama
 1946: Wally Butts, Georgia (coaches and AP)
 1947: Johnny Vaught, Ole Miss (coaches and AP)
 1948: Henry Frnka, Tulane (coaches) and Johnny Vaught, Ole Miss (AP)
 1949: Gaynell Tinsley, LSU (coaches and AP)
 1950: Robert Neyland, Tennessee (coaches) and Bear Bryant, Kentucky (AP)
 1951: Bobby Dodd, Georgia Tech (coaches) and Robert Neyland, Tennessee (AP)
 1952: Harold Drew, Alabama (coaches) and Bobby Dodd, Georgia Tech (AP)
 1953: Ralph Jordan, Auburn (coaches and AP)
 1954: Blanton Collier, Kentucky (coaches) and Johnny Vaught, Ole Miss (AP)
 1955: Art Guepe, Vanderbilt (coaches) and Johnny Vaught, Ole Miss (AP)
 1956: Bowden Wyatt, Tennessee (coaches and AP)
 1957: Wade Walker, Mississippi State (coaches) Ralph Jordan, Auburn (AP)
 1958: Paul Dietzel, LSU (coaches and AP)
 1959: Wally Butts, Georgia (coaches) and Bear Bryant,  Alabama (AP)
 1960: Ray Graves, Florida (coaches) and Johnny Vaught, Ole Miss (AP and UPI)
 1961: Bear Bryant,  Alabama (coaches, AP, and UPI)
 1962: Johnny Vaught, Ole Miss (coaches, AP, and UPI)
 1963: Ralph Jordan, Auburn (coaches and UPI) and Paul E. Davis, Mississippi State (AP)
 1964: Bear Bryant,  Alabama (coaches, AP, and UPI)
 1965: Doug Dickey, Tennessee (coaches) and Bear Bryant,  Alabama (AP and UPI)
 1966: Vince Dooley, Georgia (coaches, AP, and UPI)
 1967: Doug Dickey, Tennessee (coaches, AP, and UPI)
 1968: Vince Dooley, Georgia (coaches, AP, and UPI)
 1969: Charles McClendon, LSU (coaches, AP, and UPI)
 1970: Charles McClendon, LSU (coaches and UPI) and Charles Shira, Mississippi State (AP)
 1971: Bear Bryant, Alabama (coaches, AP, and UPI)
 1972: Ralph Jordan, Auburn (coaches, AP, and UPI)
 1973: Bear Bryant, Alabama (coaches, AP, and UPI)
 1974: Bear Bryant, Alabama (coaches and UPI) and Steve Sloan, Vanderbilt (AP)
 1975: Ken Cooper, Ole Miss (coaches, AP, and UPI)
 1976: Vince Dooley, Georgia (coaches, AP, and UPI)
 1977: Bear Bryant, Alabama (coaches and UPI) and Fran Curci, Kentucky (AP)
 1978: Vince Dooley, Georgia (coaches) and Bear Bryant, Alabama (AP and UPI)
 1979: Bear Bryant, Alabama (coaches, AP, and UPI)
 1980: Vince Dooley, Georgia (coaches and AP) and Charley Pell, Florida (UPI)
 1981: Bear Bryant, Alabama (coaches, AP, and UPI)
 1982: George MacIntyre, Vanderbilt (coaches and UPI) and Jerry Stovall, LSU (AP)
 1983: Pat Dye, Auburn (coaches and UPI), Billy Brewer, Ole Miss (AP), and Jerry Claiborne, Kentucky (AP)
 1984: Bill Arnsparger, LSU (coaches) and Galen Hall, Florida (AP and UPI)
 1985: Johnny Majors, Tennessee (coaches, AP, and UPI)
 1986: Bill Arnsparger, LSU  (coaches and AP) and Billy Brewer, Ole Miss (UPI)
 1987: Pat Dye, Auburn (coaches and AP) and Bill Curry, Alabama (UPI)
 1988: Pat Dye, Auburn (coaches, AP, and UPI)
 1989: Bill Curry, Alabama (coaches, AP, and UPI)
 1990: Billy Brewer, Ole Miss (coaches) and Steve Spurrier, Florida (AP and UPI)
 1991: Steve Spurrier, Florida (coaches) and Gerry DiNardo, Vanderbilt (AP)
 1992: Gene Stallings, Alabama (coaches and AP)
 1993: Terry Bowden, Auburn (coaches and AP)
 1994: Steve Spurrier, Florida (coaches) and Gene Stallings, Alabama (AP)
 1995: Steve Spurrier, Florida (coaches and AP)
 1996: Steve Spurrier, Florida (coaches and AP)
 1997: Jim Donnan, Georgia (coaches) and Tommy Tuberville, Ole Miss (AP)
 1998: Phillip Fulmer, Tennessee (coaches and AP)
 1999: Mike DuBose, Alabama (coaches and AP)
 2000: Lou Holtz, South Carolina (coaches and AP)
 2001: Houston Nutt, Arkansas (coaches and AP)
 2002: Mark Richt, Georgia (coaches and AP)
 2003: David Cutcliffe, Ole Miss (coaches and AP) and Nick Saban, LSU (AP)
 2004: Tommy Tuberville, Auburn (coaches and AP)
 2005: Mark Richt, Georgia (coaches) and Steve Spurrier, South Carolina (AP)
 2006: Houston Nutt, Arkansas (coaches and AP)
 2007: Sylvester Croom, Mississippi State (coaches and AP)
 2008: Nick Saban, Alabama (coaches and AP), Bobby Johnson, Vanderbilt, (coaches), and Houston Nutt, Ole Miss (coaches)
 2009: Nick Saban, Alabama (coaches and AP)
 2010: Gene Chizik, Auburn (AP), Steve Spurrier, South Carolina (coaches)
 2011: Les Miles, LSU (coaches and AP)
 2012: Kevin Sumlin, Texas A&M (coaches and AP), Will Muschamp, Florida (coaches)
 2013: Gus Malzahn, Auburn (coaches and AP)
 2014: Dan Mullen, Mississippi State (AP), Gary Pinkel, Missouri (coaches)
 2015: Jim McElwain, Florida (coaches)
 2016: Nick Saban, Alabama (coaches)
 2017: Kirby Smart, Georgia (coaches and AP)
 2018: Mark Stoops, Kentucky (AP)
 2019: Ed Orgeron, LSU (AP)
 2020: Nick Saban, Alabama (AP)
2021: Kirby Smart, Georgia (AP)
2022: Kirby Smart, Georgia (AP), Josh Heupel, Tennessee (coaches)

All-Southeastern Conference

References
General
 
 
 
 

Footnotes

College football conference awards and honors
Individual Awards